Ebrahim Hakimi (1869 – 19 October 1959) was an Iranian statesman who served as Prime Minister of Iran on three occasions.

Early life and education
Born in Tabriz in 1869, Ḥakimi was part of "an old and prominent family of court physicians", who traced their status as far back as the 17th century, "starting with the eponym of the family, Moḥammad-Dāvud Khan Ḥakim" who served at the courts of the Safavid kings (shahs) Safi (1629-1642) and Abbas II (1642-1666). This ancestor of Ebrahim was also the founder of the Hakim Mosque located in Isfahan.

After finishing elementary and high school in Tabriz, Hakimi attended Dar ol-Fonoon in Tehran and finished advanced studies in medicine in Paris.

Career
Hakimi served as royal physician to Mozzafar-al-Din Shah. He then became a member of the Parliament, and served as cabinet minister 17 times, as prime minister for three terms, and as speaker of the Senate of Iran.

His second tenure as prime minister was short-lived (three months) as the Soviets, angry over his refusal to grant them an oil concession in Northern Iran, inspired Azerbaijani Communists to declare independence from Iran. Soviet troops occupying the Northern regions refused to allow Iranian troops to enter the region to put down the uprising. Hakimi submitted the issue to the UN Security Council and resigned from office in protest of Soviet actions in January 1946.

Death
Hakimi died in Tehran in 1959.

See also
Pahlavi Dynasty
List of prime ministers of Iran

References

Sources
 
'Alí Rizā Awsatí (عليرضا اوسطى), Iran in the Past Three Centuries (Irān dar Se Qarn-e Goz̲ashteh – ايران در سه قرن گذشته), Volumes 1 and 2 (Paktāb Publishing – انتشارات پاکتاب, Tehran, Iran, 2003).  (Vol. 1),  (Vol. 2).

External links

19th-century Iranian physicians
20th-century Iranian politicians
1869 births
1959 deaths
Prime Ministers of Iran
Politicians from Tabriz
Presidents of the Senate of Iran
Revival Party politicians
Democrat Party (Persia) politicians
Members of the 1st Iranian Majlis
Members of the 2nd Iranian Majlis
Deputies of Tabriz for National Consultative Assembly